The 2003 IIFA Awards, officially known as the 4th International Indian Film Academy Awards  ceremony, presented by the International Indian Film Academy honoured the best films of 2002 and took place on 17 May 2003.

The official ceremony took place on 6 April 2002, at the Coca-Cola Dome, in Johannesburg. During the ceremony, IIFA Awards were awarded in 29 competitive categories.

Devdas led the ceremony with 18 nominations, and won a leading 16 awards including Best Film, Best Director (for Sanjay Leela Bhansali), Best Actor (for Shah Rukh Khan), Best Actress (for Aishwarya Rai) and Best Supporting Actress (for Kirron Kher), thus becoming the most-awarded film at the ceremony.

Ajay Devgan received dual nominations for Best Actor for his performances in Company and The Legend of Bhagat Singh, but lost to Shah Rukh Khan won the award for Devdas.

Winners and nominees
Winners are listed first and highlighted in boldface.

Popular awards

Musical awards

Backstage awards

Technical awards

Special awards

Outstanding Contribution to Indian Cinema
 Kalyanji Virji Shah, Anandji Virji Shah and Dev Anand

Outstanding Achievement in International Cinema
 Aparna Sen

Outstanding Achievement by an Indian in South Africa
 Ajay Gupta – MD, Sahara Computers, SA

Samsung Style Diva of the Year
 Rekha

Samsung Style Icon of the Year
 Fardeen Khan

Fresh Faces Of The Year

 John Abraham
 Esha Deol

References

External links

Iifa Awards
IIFA awards